The ace of diamonds is a playing card in the standard 52-card deck.

Ace of Diamonds may also refer to:
 El as de oros (English: The Ace of Diamonds), a 1968 Mexican film, directed by Chano Urueta
 Ace of Diamond, a Japanese baseball manga and anime series

See also

 or 

 Ace of Clubs (disambiguation)
 Ace of Hearts (disambiguation)
 Ace of Spades (disambiguation)
 Jack of Diamonds (disambiguation)
 Queen of Diamonds (disambiguation)
 King of Diamonds (disambiguation)
 The Card Sharp with the Ace of Diamonds, a painting produced around 1636-1638 by Georges de La Tour